(Kubacha)  Uhucha is a town in Kagarko Local Government Area as well as the Koro Chiefdom headquarters,  in southern Kaduna state in the Middle Belt region of Nigeria. The town has a post office and it is blessed with variety of farm produce which draw the attention of people all around the country, Kubacha is bless with market and business activity but lack of unity divide the town which lead to under-development of the community.
Kubacha town is in total black out for about 5 years now where the politician around the axis make fake promises just to win there election, Lack of Electric power is disrupting business activity.

See also
 List of villages in Kaduna State

References

Populated places in Kaduna State